Jocelyne Saab (30 April 1948 – 7 January 2019) was a Lebanese journalist and film director. She is recognized as one of the pioneers of Lebanese cinema. A reporter, photographer, scriptwriter, producer, director, artist and founder of the Cultural Resistance International Film Festival of Lebanon, Saab focused on the deprived and disadvantaged – from displaced peoples to exiled fighters, cities at war and a Fourth World without a voice. Her work is grounded in historic violence, and in an awareness of the actions and images required to document, reflect on and counteract it.

Career
Saab was born and raised in Beirut. She finished her studies of economics in the 1970s and began to work occasionally for television. Her first job was hosting a pop music program on the national Lebanese radio station called "Marsipulami got blue eyes." She next worked with Etel Adnan for As-Safa newspaper. She then became a television newsreader. Saab was also a war correspondent in Egypt and South Lebanon. She went to Libya in 1971 and covered the October War in 1973. In 1975 she worked as a reporter for French television.

When the Lebanese Civil War broke out, Saab began making documentary films. Her first documentary was called Lebanon in Turmoil. After two years, she stopped doing 'classical' documentaries and began to give her documentaries a more personal perspective. This marked her turn towards a more personal and essayistic mode of filmmaking, as her country was torn apart by conflict. As a curator at Birkbeck, University of London noted: "These beautiful and moving films infuse their powerful documentary footage of daily life amid destruction and displacement with a poetic intensity that transcends the conflict and reaches beyond despair."

After the civil war, Saab continued to make films, in both documentary and fiction formats. She travelled the world with her film Dunia, which was selected for Sundance, Toronto and many Asian festivals.<ref>Mathilde Rouxel, Jocelyne Saab, la mémoire indomptée (1970-2015), Dar an-Nahar, Beyrouth, 2015, p. 37, </ref>

Saab became part of the Network for the Promotion of Asian Cinema (NETPAC). She created the Cultural Resistance International Film Festival of Lebanon in 2013 to promote Asian cinema in Lebanon. She launched the festival in five Lebanese cities, with the intention of promoting peace and understanding.

During her last years, she pursued video art. She released 3 short videos as part of bigger projects. One Dollar A Day was also a photo exhibition, and My Name Is Mei Shigenobu was an ersatz of her last project (a long feature documentary).

Filmography

 TV reportages 

1970 : The Lebanese House (unavailable)
1970 : Bombing in a Palestinian Neighborhood (unavailable)
1973 : Kadhafi : The Green March (10 min)
1973 : Kadhafi, The Man Who Comes From Desert (60 min)
1973 : Portrait of Kadhafi (5 min)
1973 : Special Middle East : Israel (26 min)
1973 : October War (8 min) 
1973 : Middle East : Egypt (8 min)
1973 : War in Orient : Egypt (8 min)
1974 : Palestinian Keep Fighting (10 min)
1974 : Golan, on the Front Line (10 min)
1974 : Irak, War in Kurdistan (16 min)
1982 : Lebanese Hostages of Their City (6 min)
1982 : Lebanon : State of Shock (6 min)

Source:

Documentary 
1973 : Palestinian Women1974 : The Rejection Front1975 : Lebanon in Turmoil1975 : New Crusader in Orient1976 : Children of War1976 : South Lebanon, History of a Sieged Village1976 : Beirut, Never Again1976 : For A Few Lives1977 : Sahara Is Not For Sale1978 : Egypt The City of the Deaths1979 : Letter From Beirut1980 : Iran, Utopia in Motion1982 : Beirut My City1982 : The Ship of Exile1986 : The Architect of Luxor1986 : Phantoms of Alexandria1986 : Copts: Pharaohs' Cross1986 : Allah's Love1988 : The Woman Killer1989 : Al'Alma', Belly1991 : Fecondation in video1997 : The Lady of Saigon2016 : Imaginary Postcards2016 : One Dollar a Day2018 : My Name Is Mei ShigenobuFiction
1985 : A Suspended Life (Ghazal el-Banat)1994 : Once Upon A Time : Beirut, the History of a Star2005 : Dunia, Kiss Me Not on the Eyes2009 : What's Going On?Installation
2006 : Strange Games and Bridges (Dubai Art Fair ; Singapore National Museum )
2011 : Le Jardin de la guerre (Les Halles de Saerbeck, Bruxelles)
2013 : Café du Genre (MuCEM, Marseille)
2017 : One Dollar A Day (Institut Culturel Français, Istanbul/Beyrouth ; DEPO Istanbul)

 Book 
Jocelyne Saab published a book of photography, just before she died. Zones de guerre follows her whole career through stills and photographs from her films and work.

Awards
 Nomination for Grand Prix des Amériques Dunia 2005
 Nomination for the Grand Jury Prize of the Sundance Film Festival 2006

References

Further reading
Mathilde Rouxel, Jocelyne Saab, la mémoire indomptée (1970-2015), Dar an-Nahar, Beirut, 2015, 
Stefanie Van de Peer, Negotiating Dissidence, Edinburgh University Press, 2017, 
Dalia Said Mostafa, "Jocelyne Saab: A Lifetime Journey in Search of Freedom and Beauty" in: Josef Gugler (ed.), Ten Arab Filmmakers: Political Dissent and Social Critique'', Indiana University Press, 2015, pp 34–50

External links 

Website of The Jocelyne Saab's Friends Association

1948 births
2019 deaths
Lebanese women film directors
Lebanese screenwriters
Lebanese film directors
Artists from Beirut